ABB Arena is the common name for the two biggest indoor arenas in Västerås, Sweden.

Venues

Arena Nord

ABB Arena Nord is the ice hockey arena and VIK Västerås HK's home arena. It was renovated in September 2007 and has a capacity of 4,902 spectators. "ABB Arena Nord" is the renovated arena, which was earlier called Rocklundahallen.

Arena Syd

"ABB Arena Syd" is the second arena and is a multi-purpose arena mainly used for bandy, but also for concerts and exhibitions.

ABB Arena Syd is the biggest permanent indoor arena for bandy in Sweden (Friends Arena and Tele2 Arena, where a few Swedish Championship finals have been played, are bigger, but they are not usually used for bandy).

ABB Arena Syd is the home arena for Västerås SK Bandy and has a capacity of 9,000 spectators at bandy matches.

It was the main arena at the Bandy World Championship 2009. The Federation of International Bandy (FIB) have arranged training camps for developing bandy countries here.

See also
List of indoor arenas in Sweden
List of indoor arenas in Nordic countries

References

External links
ABB Arena Nord homepage on rocklunda.com
ABB Arena Syd homepage on rocklunda.com
Aerial photograph over Rocklunda (use zoom function if needed)

Indoor arenas in Sweden
Indoor ice hockey venues in Sweden
Ice hockey venues in Sweden
Bandy venues in Sweden
Buildings and structures in Västerås
Sport in Västerås
Sports venues completed in 2007
2007 establishments in Sweden
Bandy World Championships stadiums
Västerås SK Bandy
Tillberga IK Bandy